The seventh and final season of Gilmore Girls, an American dramedy television series, began airing on September 26, 2006, on The CW. The season and series concluded on May 15, 2007, after 22 episodes. This was the first and only season to air on the CW, which was a merge of UPN and the show's previous home, The WB. The season aired Tuesday nights at 8/7c.

This is the only season to not have Amy Sherman-Palladino or Daniel Palladino as a showrunner or a writer. The newly formed CW network claimed their departure was due to a salary dispute. Amy Sherman-Palladino later insisted that she and Daniel Palladino could not come to an agreement with CW because they needed a short series hiatus to rest, the hiring of more writers to relieve their work load, and an additional eighth season to finish the story lines properly. Because of this change, this season received mixed reviews from television critics and fans.

On May 3, 2007, The CW announced that the show was cancelled, and that the finale, which was filmed in April, would air on May 15.

Season seven served as the formal conclusion to the show until November 2016, when Gilmore Girls: A Year in the Life aired on Netflix, consisting of four 90-minute films. Sherman-Palladino was in charge of the new revival.

Overview
The season picks up with Lorelai having slept with Christopher immediately after ending her engagement to Luke, while Rory is attempting a long-distance relationship with Logan. Lorelai and Christopher attempt a relationship and, after going to Paris together, come back married. The marriage lasts until midway through the season but Christopher struggles to fit into Lorelai's life in Stars Hollow. Luke learns Anna is moving to New Mexico with April and applies for joint custody, winning after Lorelai gives him a glowing character reference. Christopher finds out and he and Lorelai argue, with Christopher feeling like second choice. Richard, who has just started working at Yale as a lecturer, has a heart attack during a class and Christopher stays away from the hospital while everyone worries about him. He and Lorelai eventually admit their marriage isn't right and divorce, though the divorce is never mentioned or shown. Emily struggles with the finances while Richard is convalescing and Lorelai helps her out.

Lane comes back from her honeymoon pregnant with twins. Her mother moves in with her and Zach, sending Brian to live with her relatives, but is eventually convinced to back off, with Lane giving birth to sons Steve and Kwan. Sookie also becomes pregnant for the third time, since Jackson never had the vasectomy she arranged for him. Michel's dog Chin Chin dies and Lorelai organises a memorial at the inn. Luke sells the boat he inherited from his father to Kirk and buys a larger one so he can take a trip with April over the summer, but she has to cancel when she is accepted to science camp.

Rory and Logan try to spend time together while he works in London and New York. Rory feels awkward living in his old apartment rent-free so moves back in with Paris and Doyle. She also befriends Lucy and Olivia, two girls she met at an art exhibition. Lucy's boyfriend turns out to be Marty, who pretends not to know Rory. Rory goes along with it, upsetting Lucy when Logan tells her the truth, but Lucy breaks up with Marty and reconciles with Rory. Logan pursues a software deal against Mitchum's wishes, losing his trust fund and costing the company a multimillion-dollar lawsuit for patent infringement. Logan resigns and takes a job in San Francisco. Paris is accepted into every grad school she applies to but Rory is rejected for an internship. In the penultimate episode, Paris and Doyle depart for Harvard Medical. Logan proposes to Rory at a graduation party thrown by Richard and Emily but she turns him down, not willing to put him ahead of her career, and he breaks up with her.

In the series finale, Rory gets a job covering Barack Obama's election campaign for an online newspaper but has to leave in three days, throwing off plans for a graduation re-enactment. Luke organises a farewell party for her with the town. Emily tries to find a way to get involved in the running of the inn in order to stay close to Lorelai, but Lorelai assures her she will keep attending Friday night dinners. Lorelai and Luke share a kiss at the party and the show ends with Lorelai and Rory sharing a last meal at Luke's diner.

Cast

Main cast
 Lauren Graham as Lorelai Gilmore, Rory's mother.
 Alexis Bledel as Rory Gilmore, Lorelai's daughter.
 Scott Patterson as Luke Danes, the owner of the local diner and Lorelai's ex-fiance.
 Melissa McCarthy as Sookie St. James, Lorelai's best friend and co-worker.
 Keiko Agena as Lane Kim, Rory's best friend.
 Yanic Truesdale as Michel Gerard, Lorelai and Sookie's co-worker.
 Liza Weil as Paris Geller, Rory's classmate and close friend.
 Sean Gunn as Kirk Gleason, a resident of Stars Hollow who works many jobs.
 Matt Czuchry as Logan Huntzberger, Rory's boyfriend.
 Kelly Bishop as Emily Gilmore, Lorelai's mother and Rory's grandmother.
 Edward Herrmann as Richard Gilmore, Lorelai's father and Rory's grandfather.

Recurring cast
 David Sutcliffe as Christopher Hayden, Rory's father and Lorelai's husband.
 Liz Torres as Miss Patty, the owner of the local dance studio.
 Sally Struthers as Babette Dell, Rory and Lorelai's nextdoor neighbor.
 Jackson Douglas as Jackson Belleville, Sookie's husband.
 Emily Kuroda as Mrs. Kim, Lane's religious mother.
 Michael Winters as Taylor Doose, the owner of the local grocery store.
 Kathleen Wilhoite as Liz Danes, Luke's younger sister.
 Michael DeLuise as TJ, Liz's husband.
 Ted Rooney as Morey Dell, Rory and Lorelai's nextdoor neighbor.
 Todd Lowe as Zach Van Gerbig, Lane's husband and bandmate.
 John Cabrera as Brian Fuller, Lane's bandmate.
 Sebastian Bach as Gil, Lane's bandmate.
 Danny Strong as Doyle McMaster, Paris's husband.
 Gregg Henry as Mitchum Huntzberger, Logan's father.
 Sherilyn Fenn as Anna Nardini, Luke's ex-girlfriend and April's mother.
 Vanessa Marano as April Nardini, Luke and Anna's daughter.
 Krysten Ritter as Lucy, Rory's classmate and good friend.
 Michelle Ongkingco as Olivia Marquont, Rory's classmate and good friend.
 Wayne Wilcox as Marty, Rory's old friend and Lucy's boyfriend.
   Nicolette Coiller as Gigi Hayden, Christopher's daughter, Rory's half-sister, and Lorelai's stepdaughter.

Episodes

DVD release

References

Season
2006 American television seasons
2007 American television seasons